The Rhue (also called Grande Rhue) is a  river in the Puy-de-Dôme, Cantal and Corrèze départements, south central France. It flows generally southwest. It is a left tributary of the Dordogne into which it flows at Bort-les-Orgues.

Its main tributaries are the Santoire, the Petite Rhue and the Tarentaine.

Communes along its course
This list is ordered from source to mouth: 
Puy-de-Dôme: Besse-et-Saint-Anastaise, Picherande, Égliseneuve-d'Entraigues 
Cantal: Chanterelle, Condat, Saint-Amandin, Montboudif, Trémouille, Saint-Étienne-de-Chomeil, Champs-sur-Tarentaine-Marchal, Antignac, Vebret
Corrèze: Bort-les-Orgues

References

Rivers of France
Rivers of Puy-de-Dôme
Rivers of Cantal
Rivers of Corrèze
Rivers of Auvergne-Rhône-Alpes
Rivers of Nouvelle-Aquitaine